Events from the year 1216 in Ireland.

Incumbent
Lord: John (until 19 October), then Henry III

Events
25 February – Pope Innocent III confirms union of the vacant episcopal see of the Bishop of Glendalough with that of the Archbishop of Dublin (Henry de Loundres).
After 11 August – Echdonn Mac Gilla Uidir, Archbishop of Armagh, dies in Rome.
18/19 October – death of John, King of England and Lord of Ireland; he is succeeded by his 9-year-old son Henry.
12 November – Great Charter of Ireland ("Magna Carta Hiberniae") issued in the name of King Henry III of England.
The abbots of Jerpoint and Mellifont Abbeys are deposed by the Cistercians' general chapter.
Ballintubber Abbey is founded by King Cathal Crobhdearg Ua Conchobair of Connacht.
Following resignation of the Bishop of Mayo (? Patricius) the see is transferred to the Archbishop of Tuam (Felix Ua Ruanada).
Castle at Killaloe built by Geoffrey de Marisco, Justiciar of Ireland.
The deanery of Kells was created by Simon Rochfort, Bishop of Meath

References

 
1210s in Ireland
Ireland
Years of the 13th century in Ireland